Comet Morehouse (modern formal designation: C/1908 R1) was a bright, non-periodic comet discovered by US astronomer Daniel Walter Morehouse and first observed on September 1, 1908 at Yerkes Observatory in Williams Bay, Wisconsin. Morehouse was a graduate student at the time. It was unusual in the rapid variations seen in the structure of its tail. At times, the tail seemed to split into up to six separate tails; at others, the tail appeared completely detached from the head of the comet. The tail was further unusual in that it formed while the comet was still 2 AU away from the Sun (where distances of 1.5 AU are more usual), and that there was a high concentration of the CO+ ion in its spectrum.

As is typical for comets fresh from the Oort Cloud, its orbital solution is more or less parabolic; if its orbit is in fact closed, it will likely not return for millions of years.

References

External links 
 
 Photographs of Comet Morehouse from the Lick Observatory Records Digital Archive, UC Santa Cruz Library's Digital Collections
 

Non-periodic comets
1908 in science
19080901